Hypocrita mirabilis is a moth of the family Erebidae. It was described by Hervé de Toulgoët in 1988. It is found in Ecuador.

References
Notes

Sources
 

Hypocrita
Moths described in 1988